The Battle of the Hill of the Jews (named by Miguel de Castanhoso for a community of Beta Israel who lived there) was a battle fought in Ethiopia in August 1542 between the Portuguese forces of Cristóvão da Gama and the Adal Muslim followers of Ahmad ibn Ibrahim al-Ghazi. The Portuguese won the battle, capturing many horses that they could have used to exploit their victory in the previous battle of Jarte. 

The benefits of this victory were short-lived, for within the month da Gama was slain in Wofla even before his soldiers escorting the captured animals could reach the Portuguese encampment at Lake Ashenge.

The location of this battle is not known. Whiteway has argued that this place is identical with Amba Geshen, located far to the south of the Portuguese camp. More recently, however, C.F. Beckingham has argued that the battle took place in the eastern Semien Mountains near the left bank of the Tekezé River.

References 

Hill of the Jews
1542 in Africa
1542 in Ethiopia
1542 in the Portuguese Empire
Hill of the Jews
Hill of the Jews
Hill of the Jews